Fissurella macrotrema is a species of sea snail, a marine gastropod mollusk in the family Fissurellidae, the keyhole limpets and slit limpets.

Description
The size of the shell reaches 35 mm.

Distribution
This species occurs in the Pacific Ocean off tropical West America; not off the Galapagos Islands.

References

External links
 To World Register of Marine Species

Fissurellidae
Gastropods described in 1834